Vinita is a city and county seat of Craig County, Oklahoma, United States.  As of the 2010 census, the population was 5,743, a decline of 11.22 percent from the figure of 6,469 recorded in 2000.

History

Vinita was founded in 1870 by Elias Cornelius Boudinot. In 1889, gunman and lawman Tom Threepersons was born there. It was the first city in the state with electricity. The city was first named "Downingville", and was a primarily Native American community. It was later renamed "Vinita" after Boudinot's friend, sculptor Vinnie Ream. The city was incorporated in Indian Territory in 1898.

Vinita is along the path of the Texas Road cattle trail, and the later Jefferson Highway of the early National Trail System, both roughly along the route of U.S. Route 69 through Oklahoma today.

The First National Bank opened in 1892, and the local Masonic Lodge was founded in 1894. Newspapers founded before the turn of the 20th Century included Vinita Indian Chieftain (1882), Vinita Leader (1885) and the Daily Indian Chieftain (1899). The Vinita Daily Journal began publication in 1907 and has continued into the 21st Century.

Eastern State Hospital, a state mental health facility, was constructed in 1912 and admitted the first patients in January 1913. It was one of the county's largest employers until its operations were reduced during the 1990s.

A McDonald's bridge-restaurant built over the top of Interstate 44, called the "Will Rogers Archway", is the world's largest McDonald's restaurant in terms of area, occupying . Built in 1957, it is also the world's first bridge restaurant.

Geography
Vinita is located in northeastern Oklahoma, a region of the state known as Green Country. According to the Vinita Chamber of Commerce, the town is often called the "Crossroads to Green Country." It sits at the base of the Ozark Highlands topographical region in a mix of prairie and forest. It is located in southern Craig County at  (36.641193, −95.156676). Vinita is in a valley.

Demographics

As of the census of 2000, there were 6,472 people, 2,381 households, and 1,454 families residing in the city. The population density was 1,486.9 people per square mile (574.4/km). There were 2,694 housing units at an average density of 618.9 per square mile (239.1/km). The racial makeup of the city was 67.32% White, 6.12% African American, 14.86% Native American, 0.28% Asian, 0.03% Pacific Islander, 0.62% from other races, and 10.77% from two or more races. Hispanic or Latino of any race were 1.48% of the population.

There were 2,381 households, out of which 28.9% had children under the age of 18 living with them, 44.9% were married couples living together, 12.9% had a female householder with no husband present, and 38.9% were non-families. 35.7% of all households were made up of individuals, and 19.2% had someone living alone who was 65 years of age or older. The average household size was 2.29 and the average family size was 2.97.

In the city, the population was spread out, with 21.7% under the age of 18, 8.0% from 18 to 24, 30.0% from 25 to 44, 22.4% from 45 to 64, and 17.9% who were 65 years of age or older. The median age was 40 years. For every 100 females, there were 105.1 males. For every 100 females age 18 and over, there were 103.5 males.

The median income for a household in the city was $27,511, and the median income for a family was $33,461. Males had a median income of $26,263 versus $18,182 for females. The per capita income for the city was $13,980. About 14.3% of families and 17.2% of the population were below the poverty line, including 21.0% of those under age 18 and 11.7% of those age 65 or over.

Economy
Early in its history, cattle ranching in the surrounding countryside contributed heavily to Vinita's economy. When Craig County was created at statehood, Vinita was designated as the county seat. City and county governments became significant employers. In 1935, the Grand River Dam Authority (GRDA) was created. GRDA put its headquarters in Vinita. It is still one of the largest employers in the city, along with two of its many customers: Kansas, Arkansas, Missouri, and Oklahoma Electric Company (KAMO) and Northeast Oklahoma Electric Co-op. Other important employers have included trucking companies, tower-building companies, Munsingwear, General Mills, Cinch, Dana Industries, and Hope Industries.

Government
Administrative
Mayor - Chuck Hoskin
Brian Prince - City Clerk

City Council
Dale Haire and Stephanie Hoskin - Ward 1
Dr. Danny Lankford and John Swift - Ward 2
Roger Tyler and Skip Briley - Ward 3
Terry Young and Kevin Wofford - Ward 4

Education

Educational institutions were begun during Vinita's earliest days. Worcester Academy opened in 1883. The Worcester Academy in Vinita should not be confused with the Worcester Academy that was founded in 1843 in Worcester, Massachusetts. The Massachusetts school is still in operation. It was followed by Willie Halsell College in 1888. Halsell College was originally established as Galloway College, named for Methodist Bishop Charles B. Galloway. The school was renamed in 1891 for Willie Halsell, the deceased daughter of a wealthy rancher, W. E. Halsell, who had rescued the school financially. However, the school again failed and closed permanently in 1908. The Roman Catholic Church operated Sacred Heart Academy, a boarding school, from 1897 until 1968.

Transportation

Air
Vinita Municipal Airport (FAA Identifier H04) has served the city since 1965. It is about  SE of downtown Vinita. The street address is 104 East Illinois Street. The airport manager is Allen Goforth. This is a municipally-owned facility that primarily handles personal or chartered aircraft, with no scheduled airline service.

South Grand Lake Regional Airport (FAA Identifier 1K8) is further to the southeast of Vinita.  Starting as a grass strip in 2005, the current facility includes a 75’ x 5,200’ hard-surface runway, runway lights and GPS all weather approach.

Theldor Airfield was a temporary World War II airfield located approximately 4 miles (6.4 km) north-northeast of Vinita. It was closed after the war.

Notable people
 Jim Beauchamp (1939–2007), Born in Vinita; MLB baseball player
 Bryan Burk (1968-present), Born in Vinita, American television personality, actor
 Yvonne Chouteau (1929–2016), became world-famous ballerina (one of the "Five Moons")
 Jim Edgar (1946–Present), Born in Vinita, but raised in Charleston, Illinois, was Illinois governor (1991-1999)
 Phil McGraw (1950–Present), Born in Vinita; American television personality, author, psychologist
 Tom Threepersons (1889—1969), Possibly born in Vinita; lawman, gunfighter, and inventor of the Threepersons holster.
 W. H. Kornegay (1865–1935), Came to Vinita ca. 1891; served on Constitutional Convention; was appointed Justice of the Oklahoma Supreme Court.

National Register of Historic Places

Nine of the ten NHRP-listed locations in Craig County are in Vinita:
 Attucks School
 Carselowey House
 Craig County Courthouse
 First Methodist Episcopal Church, South
 Hotel Vinita
 Little Cabin Creek Bridge
 McDougal Filling Station
 Randall Tire Company
 Spraker Service Station

Gallery

Notes

References

External links

 City of Vinita
 Vinita Chamber of Commerce
Glass House Oral History Project

Cities in Craig County, Oklahoma
Cities in Oklahoma
County seats in Oklahoma
Populated places established in 1870
1870 establishments in Indian Territory
Cherokee towns in Oklahoma